Trucios-Turtzioz (Turtzioz in Basque; Trucios in Spanish; Trucíos in Cantabrian) is a town and municipality located in the province of Biscay, in the Autonomous Community of Basque Country, northern Spain, surrounded by other municipalities of Biscay and Cantabria. 

The name comes from a cold water spring, which existed, or still exists, in the center of the town. In Basque, Iturriotz (cold spring)

References

External links

 TRUCIOS-TURTZIOZ in the Bernardo Estornés Lasa - Auñamendi Encyclopedia (Euskomedia Fundazioa) 
  (Delimitación del sistema kárstico del manantial de Iturriotz (Trucios, Vizcaya)) (in spanish)

	

Municipalities in Biscay